Álvaro Augusto Velasco Alzate (born March 3, 1971) is a retired male weightlifter from Colombia, who thrice won a medal for his native South American country at the Pan American Games: in 1991, 1995 and 1999. He twice competed at the Summer Olympics (1992 and 1996), finishing in 12th place in the men's middleweight division in Atlanta, Georgia (1996).

References
 sports-reference

1971 births
Living people
Colombian male weightlifters
Olympic weightlifters of Colombia
Weightlifters at the 1992 Summer Olympics
Weightlifters at the 1996 Summer Olympics
Weightlifters at the 1991 Pan American Games
Weightlifters at the 1995 Pan American Games
Weightlifters at the 1999 Pan American Games
Pan American Games gold medalists for Colombia
Pan American Games silver medalists for Colombia
Pan American Games medalists in weightlifting
Central American and Caribbean Games medalists in weightlifting
Medalists at the 1991 Pan American Games
Medalists at the 1995 Pan American Games
20th-century Colombian people
21st-century Colombian people